Emil Imre (born 8 March 1996) is a Romanian short track speed skater of Hungarian ethnicity.

Imre's greatest achievement up to date is a gold medal he won in the 1000 metres event at the 2013 European Youth Olympic Winter Festival (EYOWF). This was also the first Romanian gold in the competition's history, having collected four bronze medals at the previous editions. Additionally, Imre finished second and earned the silver medal in the 500 metres race at the EYOWF.

Personal records
As of 30 November 2013

References

1996 births
Living people
Romanian male short track speed skaters
Sportspeople from Miercurea Ciuc
Romanian sportspeople of Hungarian descent
Székely people